The openbill storks or openbills are two species of stork (family Ciconiidae) in the genus Anastomus. They are large wading birds characterized by large bills, the mandibles of which do not meet except at the tip. This feature develops only in the adults. Both species feed predominantly on molluscs. The roof of the upper bill is fringed with plate-like structures ("lamellae") in the African openbill, but these are absent in the Asian openbill.

The genus Anastomus was erected by the French naturalist Pierre Bonnaterre in 1791. The type species was subsequently designated as the Asian openbill (Anastomus oscitans). The name Anastomus is from the Ancient Greek αναστομοω anastomoō meaning "to furnish with a mouth" or "with mouth wide-opened".

There are two species of openbilled storks:

References

Taxa named by Pierre Joseph Bonnaterre